Kazimierz Teofil Pochwalski (25 December 1855 – 7 November 1940) was a Polish painter known primarily for his portraits, although he produced works in a wide variety of genres.

Early life
Pochwalski was born in Kraków on 25 December 1855 and came from a family that produced several generations of painters and his younger brother Władysław also became a well-known artist. From 1871 to 1879, he studied at the Kraków Academy of Fine Arts under Jan Matejko, then attended the Academy of Fine Arts, Munich, from 1879 to 1888. This was followed by studies in Vienna and Paris, where he was influenced by the work of Léon Bonnat.

Career
He served as Director of the Kraków Society of Friends of Fine Arts and traveled extensively, visiting Greece, Italy, Turkey and Egypt.

From 1893 to 1918, he was a professor at the Academy of Fine Arts in Vienna, where he painted many portraits at the Imperial Court and became a member of the Vienna Secession.

He returned to Poland in 1919 and continued to paint portraits of notable people, including Henryk Sienkiewicz, Leon Piniński, Agenor Maria Gołuchowski and Józef Ignacy Kraszewski.

Gallery

See also
List of Polish painters

References

External links 

 Pochwalski family website: Detailed biography
 Pochwalski family website: More works by Pochwalski
 ArtNet: More works by Pochwalski
 Arcadja: More works by Pochwalski

1855 births
1940 deaths
Portrait painters
Artists from Kraków
19th-century Polish painters
19th-century Polish male artists
20th-century Polish painters
20th-century Polish male artists
Polish male painters